Hammersbach  (758 m above sea level) is a village in the municipality of Grainau at the foot of the  Wetterstein Mountains in South Germany. It is located at the southwestern end of the market town of Garmisch-Partenkirchen and is an important base for tours by mountaineers and hikers.

There is a halt on the Bavarian Zugspitze Railway and Eibsee bus within the parish, which runs from Garmisch-Partenkirchen to the Eibsee.

Summits 
From Hammersbach the following summits may be ascended by experienced Alpinists:
Waxenstein (2,277 m)
Alpspitze (2,628 m) via the Höllentorkopf and Osterfelderkopf or Matheisenkar cirque and Grieskarscharte col
Zugspitze (2,962 m) through the Höllental valley and over the Höllentalferner

Trails 
Eibsee Circular Trail (Eibsee-Rundweg): From Hammersbach along the ridgeway (Höhenweg) to the Eibsee Hotel, then around the Eibsee lake and back (ca. 15 km/height difference 500 m)
Höllental valley via the Höllental entrance hut through the Höllental Gorge to the Höllentalanger Hut.
From the Höllentalanger Hut (1,387 m) to the Höllentor (2,050 m) and on to the cable car station of Osterfelderkopf.
From the Höllentalanger Hut over the Hupfleitenjoch to the cable car station of Kreuzeckhaus (1,680 m)
From Hammersbach via Waldeck (1,238 m) to the Kreuzjoch (1,719 m)

References 

Garmisch-Partenkirchen (district)